Hilmar Jensson (born 1966) is an Icelandic guitarist.

Biography 
Jensson picked up the guitar at a young age. He studied at the FIH music school in Iceland from 1982 and then in 1991 attended the Berklee College of Music, in Boston. During this time he took in private lessons with Mick Goodrick, Jerry Bergonzi, and Hal Crook.

He then returned to Iceland, but from 1993 to 1994 he studied with Joe Lovano in New York. As sideman he has collaborated with Tim Berne, Wadada Leo Smith, Kevin Drumm, Herb Robertson, Trevor Dunn, Greg Bendian, Chris Speed, Briggan Krauss, Jamie Saft, Cuong Vu, Rafael Toral, Carlos Zingaro, Tom Rainey, Ben Perowsky, Per Jørgensen, Eyvind Kang, Arve Henriksen and Ståle Storløkken, among others.

In 1999 Jensson joined the Jim Black in the band AlasNoAxis. In 2001 he founded the New York band 'Tyft' together with Jim Black and Andrew D'Angelo. He also is a founding member of the band 'Kitchen Motors', an Icelandic artist organization that also acts as a record label.

Discography

Solo albums 
1995: Dofinn (Jazzís)
1999: Kerfill (Smekkleysa)
2004: Ditty Blei (Songlines)

 With 'Tyft' trio including Andrew D'Angelo and Jim Black
2002: Tyft (Songlines)
2004: Smell The Difference (Skirl)
2006: Meg Nem Sa (Skirl)

Collaborations 
 With Kjartan Ólafsson
1997: Thrír Heimar í Einum (Smekkleysa)
2000: Völuspá (Erkitíd)

 With Óskar Gudjónsson
1997: Far (Steinar)

 With Kjartan Valdemarsson, Matthías M.D. Hemstock, and Pétur Grétarsson
1998: Traust (Smekkleysa)

With 'Didda'
1998: Strokid Og Slegid (Bad Taste)

 With Jóel Pálsson
1998: Prím (Naxos)
2001: Klif (Omi)
2008: Varp (Flugur)

 With Skúli Sverrisson
1998: Kjár (Smekkleysa)
2002: Napoli 23 (Smekkleysa)
2007: Seria (12 Tonar)

 With VA
1999: Nart Nibbles (Kitchen Motors)
2001: Motorlab 1 (Kitchen Motors)
2001: Strings And Stings (Kitchen Motors), with Rafael Toral

 With Terje Isungset
2000: Floating Rhythms (Via Music)
2002: Iceman Is (Jazzland)

 With Óskar Gudjónsson
2000: Delerad (M&M)

 With Jim Black's AlasNoAxis
 2000: Alasnoaxis (Winter & Winter)
 2002: Splay (Winter & Winter)
 2004: Habyor (Winter & Winter)
 2006: Dogs of Great Indifference (Winter & Winter)
 2009: Houseplant (Winter & Winter)
 2013: Antiheroes (Winter & Winter)

 With Tomas R. Einarsson
 2002: Kubanska (Omi)

 With Unn Patterson
 2003: Run (Tutl)

 With 'Yeah No'
 2004: Swell Henry (Squealer)

 With Jóhann Jóhannsson
 2005: Dis (12 Tónar)

 With 'Kira Kira'
 2008: Our Map of the Monster Olympics (Bad Taste)

 With 'Mógil'
 2008: Ró (Radical Duke Entertainment)
 2011: Í Stillunni Hljómar (Mógil Music)

 With Trevor Dunn's MadLove
2009: White With Foam (Ipecac)

 With 'Outhouse'
 2011: Straw, Sticks + Bricks (Babel)

 With Ruben Machtelinckx, Joachim Badenhorst, and Nathan Wouters
 2011: Faerge (El Negocito)
 2014: Flock (El Negocito)

 With Bly De Blyant
 2013: ABC (Hubro)
 2014: Hindsight Bias (Hubro)
 2016: The Third Bly De Blyant Album (Hubro)

References

External links 

20th-century guitarists
21st-century guitarists
Jazz guitarists
Jazz composers
Hilmar Jensson
Hilmar Jensson
Hilmar Jensson
1966 births
Living people
20th-century male musicians
21st-century male musicians